Clareville is an unincorporated community in Bee County, in the U.S. state of Texas. According to the Handbook of Texas, the community had a population of 23 in 2000. It is located within the Beeville micropolitan area.

History
The area in what is now known as Clareville today was established in 1874 by Henry T. Clare, who moved to the area from Missouri in 1840 and fought in the Mexican-American War, and his sons. It was originally called Lomita but changed its name to Clareville in the late 1880s. Clare married Ella Layton and then settled in Lavaca County in 1849. Then they moved to the Central Community on Aransas Creek alongside his brother in 1856. Swarms of grasshoppers raided the area in 1879 and the land was divided among new residents. J.H. Bell opened the first store in Clareville in 1886. When the car was invented and roads were built toward nearby Beeville, the community subsequently declined. Its population was 50 in 1940, which went down to 23 from 1989 through 2000.

Geography

Education
Clareville had a school with one teacher and 49 students in the 1898-1899 school year. It joined the Skidmore-Tynan Independent School District in 1940. The community continues to be served by Skidmore-Tynan ISD today.

References

Unincorporated communities in Bee County, Texas
Unincorporated communities in Texas